Statistics of Swiss Super League in the 1961–62 season.

Overview
It was contested by 14 teams, and Servette FC Genève won the championship.

League standings

Results

Sources
 Switzerland 1961–62 at RSSSF

Swiss Football League seasons
Swiss
1961–62 in Swiss football